The 22839 / 22840 Rourkela – Bhubaneswar Intercity Express is a Express express train belonging to Indian Railways South Eastern Railway zone that runs between  and  in India.

Coaches 
The 22839 / 40 Rourkela Junction – Bhubaneswar Intercity Superfast Express has two AC chair car, four second sitting, six general unreserved & two SLR (seating with luggage rake) coaches .

As is customary with most train services in India, coach composition may be amended at the discretion of Indian Railways depending on demand.

Service 

Routing 

Traction 
As the route is fully electrified, a WAP-7 Electric locomotive from Tatanagar Loco Shed pulls the train to its destination.

References

External links 
 22839 Intercity Express at India Rail Info
 22840 Intercity Express at India Rail Info

Intercity Express (Indian Railways) trains
Transport in Rourkela
Rail transport in Odisha
Transport in Bhubaneswar